CPCS Transcom Limited (commonly known as CPCS) is an international infrastructure development firm specialising in private sector participation in transportation and power infrastructure, operations, investment, policy and regulation.  An Ottawa, Ontario-based company, CPCS operates in more than 80 countries worldwide, particularly in Africa and Southeast Asia.  Established in 1996 via a merger of firms, Hickling Transcom and CPCS International, CPCS Transcom was recognized by the 1999 Canadian Information Productivity Awards for its "Comprehensive Information and Systems Core Business Strategy".  CPCS is governed by a board of directors that includes a full complement of non-executive directors.

Services
CPCS provides advisory services across a broad spectrum of infrastructure sectors, including: ports and port facilities, railways, urban transit and property development, electric power, marine, multimodal logistics and roads.  CPCS has international expertise in the areas of transaction structuring, public-private partnerships (PPP), financial and economic modeling, legal and regulatory reform, operations, engineering and social and environmental advisory. CPCS also provides services across the full spectrum of the infrastructure cycle, from creating an enabling environment to negotiating a successful transaction.

Projects
Projects with which CPCS is associated include:
 East African Railway Master Plan
 Lagos Rail Mass Transit
 OSCAR Railway Costing
 Privatization of Generation and Distribution Companies/Nigerian Power Sector Review
 African Integrated High Speed Rail Network

References

External links
CPCS Transcom Limited, official site
Lagos Blue Line; article 'Lagos metro draws on international expertise'
CPCS Transcom at Alacrastore
Ministry of Transport, Jordan; article 'CPCS Transcom Selected to Assist the Government of Jordan with the Privatization of the Aqaba Railway Corporation', retrieved 20 Jan 2009

International engineering consulting firms
Engineering consulting firms of Canada
Companies based in Ottawa
Construction and civil engineering companies of Canada